Form 1 Planet is the second studio album by Australian rock band Rockmelons. The album peaked at number 3 on the ARIA Charts and was certified platinum.

Track listing
All songs written by R. Medhurst, B. Jones, J. Jones, R. Smith.

 "That Word (L.O.V.E.)" – 4:10
 "Stronger Together" – 4:45
 "Form One Planet" – 4:13
 "It's Not Over" – 6:28
 "Love's Gonna Bring You Home" – 5:56
 "Rain" – 4:08
 "More Tales of the City" – 4:35
 "Dance Floor" – 4:19
 "Ain't No Sunshine" – 3:17  
 "Bubble and Squeak" – 3:54

Personnel
Credited to:

Rockmelons
 Raymond Medhurst – keyboards  
 Byron Jones – keyboards, bass guitar, vocals  
 Jonathon Jones – keyboards, guitar, drums
 John Kenny – vocals
 Doug Williams – vocals
 Deni Hines – vocals

Charts

Weekly charts

Year-end charts

Certifications

References

1992 albums
Rockmelons albums